Flaugher is a surname. Notable people with this name include:
Brenna Flaugher, American cosmologist
John Flaugher, original name of Michael Reagan, American political commentator and adopted son of president Ronald Reagan
Jonny Flaugher, American musician, supporting member of pop-folk duo The Weepies